Truls Waagø (born January 6, 1964) is a Norwegian bass guitarist. He has been employed by the Trondheim Symphony Orchestra since 1987 and he is often used as an orchestral arranger. Waagø began his career with the band Slagerfabrikken in the 1970s. In addition to playing in the symphony orchestra, Waagø has also played in several other musical groups, including Tre Små Kinesere, Tango Concertino, Motorpsykkel, Revolver, and Adamseplene.

Compositions
Waagø has produced several compositions in recent years, including the following:
 Lots Hustru (Lot's Wife). For women's choir and string orchestra
 Postcards. For symphony orchestra
 Aidsmesse (Aids Mass). For choir and sinfonietta
 Latin Concert, 2005. Violin concerto for violin solo and symphony orchestra
 M.E.G., 2006. For solo violin, viola, cello, and string orchestra
 Norsk dans no. 2006 (Norwegian dance no. 2006), 2006. For symphony orchestra
 Musikk for strykekvartett (Music for String Orchestra), 2006

Discography
Tango Concertino
 Live in Olavshallen (1994)
Adamseplene
 Adamseplene.no (1999)
Helter Skelter
 Out of Range (2004)
Valeria
 Street Tango (2009)
Tre Små Kinesere
 Tro håp & kjærlighet (1996, studio musicians)
 Storeslem (1998, studio musicians)
 Gammel sykkel (2003, studio musicians)
 Kjærlighet på tunga (2010)
 I Live (2011)
Other recordings
 DumDum Boys: Sus (1996)
 Postgirobygget: Melis (1996)
 Student Society in Trondheim: Alt er sex (1997)
 Postgirobygget: Essensuell (1997)
 Postgirobygget: Best av alt (2003)
 Various artists: Ringnes 2003 (2003)
 Bajan: Ear (2006)
 Are & A-laget: Få sjå på (2007)
 The Soundbyte / Paul Irgens: City of Glass (2007)
 Øystein Dolmen: Hjertespeil (2007)
 Too Far Gone: Livåt, (Too Far Gone 15 År) (2008)
 Øyvind Holm & Ulf Risnes: Safe and Sorry (2009)
 Øystein Baadsvik: Snowflakes: A Classical Christmas (2011)
 Børge Rømma: Bankers (2015)

References

External links
 Truls Waagø's homepage

Norwegian bass guitarists
Norwegian male bass guitarists
Musicians from Trondheim
1964 births
Living people